Baha Akşit  (March 6, 1914 – September 27, 1995) was a Turkish physician and politician. He served as a member of the Grand National Assembly and of the Senate of the Republic.

Akşit was sentenced to death in 1961 after the overthrow of the government led by Adnan Menderes.

See also
List of Turkish physicians

References

20th-century Turkish physicians
1914 births
1995 deaths
Deputies of Denizli